Vandasina is a monotypic genus of flowering plants in the legume family, Fabaceae. It belongs to the subfamily Faboideae.
It only contains one known species, Vandasina retusa 

It is native to the island of New Guinea and Queensland (in Australia).

The genus and species were both first published in Taxon Vol.31 on page 559 in 1982.

The genus name of Vandasina is in honour of Karel (Karl) Vandas (1861–1923), who was a (Bohemian-) Czech Botanist and teacher, who taught in Prague and was Professor of Agriculture and forestry at the Technical College in Brno.

References

Phaseoleae
Fabaceae genera
Flora of New Guinea
Flora of Queensland